Cape Engaño may refer to:

 Cape Engaño (Luzon), Philippines
Cape Engaño Lighthouse
 Cape Engaño (Dominican Republic)

See also 
 Engano River (disambiguation)